Henry Brandon (26 March 1870 – 1935) was a Scottish footballer who played in the Football League for The Wednesday; he won the FA Cup with the club in 1896).

He had several relatives who played the game: cousins Tom (also an FA Cup winner, with Blackburn Rovers), James and Bob all played for St Mirren and Sheffield Wednesday to some extent, and Tom's son of the same name played for clubs including Hull City.

References

1870 births
1935 deaths
Scottish footballers
Footballers from North Ayrshire
People from Kilbirnie
English Football League players
Association football midfielders
St Mirren F.C. players
Clyde F.C. players
Chesterfield F.C. players
Sheffield Wednesday F.C. players
FA Cup Final players
Football Alliance players